Siena College is a Roman Catholic secondary school for girls in Camberwell, a suburb of Melbourne, Australia. It was founded by the Dominican Sisters in 1940. It is a member of Girls Sport Victoria and the Alliance of Girls' Schools Australasia.

Sport 
Siena is a member of Girls Sport Victoria (GSV).

GSV premierships 
Siena has won the following GSV premierships.

 Basketball (5) - 2011, 2012, 2013, 2014, 2016
 Indoor Cricket (3) - 2012, 2018, 2019
 Soccer - 2013

Notable alumnae
Susan Alberti AO, philanthropist and businesswoman
Sonya Hartnett, author/novelist
Angela Savage, author
Magda Szubanski, (born 1961) actress and comedian
Michele Timms, (born 1965), athlete and basketball coach
Emelia Jackson, (born 1989), pastrycook and reality television contestant

See also
Santa Sabina College

References

External
School Website
Profile at The Good Schools Guide

Dominican schools in Australia
Girls Sport Victoria
Catholic secondary schools in Melbourne
Girls' schools in Victoria (Australia)
Alliance of Girls' Schools Australasia
Educational institutions established in 1940
1940 establishments in Australia
Buildings and structures in the City of Boroondara